Song of Spring is a 2022 Chinese drama film written and directed by Yang Lina and starring Wu Yanshu and Xi Meijuan. The film tells the family story of an 85-year-old mother caring for a 65-year-old daughter with Alzheimer's disease. Song of Spring premiered in China on 10 September 2022.

Cast
 Wu Yanshu as Mother
 Xi Meijuan as Daughter who suffers from Alzheimer's disease.
 Wen Qi as Zhou Xia
 Zhu Shimao as Doctor
 Li Xiaochuan as Police
 Ren Luomin as Father
 Yang Enyou as Child

Soundtrack

Release
Song of Spring was theatrically released on 10 September 2022.

Reception
Douban, a major Chinese media rating site, gave the drama 7.5 out of 10.

Accolades

References

External links
 
 

2022 films
2020s Mandarin-language films
Chinese drama films
Films shot in Shanghai
2022 drama films